Milan Čokić (born 15 August 1991) is a Serbian professional footballer who plays as a forward.

Career
During his career, Čokić played in four countries, namely Serbia (Mladenovac, Smederevo, Moravac Mrštane, and Sopot), Hungary (Siófok and Bajai, both on loan from Kecskemét), Slovenia (Ilirija 1911), and Albania (Besëlidhja Lezhë).

Personal life
Čokić is the older brother of fellow footballer Dimitrije Čokić.

References

External links
 

1991 births
Living people
Footballers from Belgrade
Serbian footballers
Association football forwards
OFK Mladenovac players
Kecskeméti TE players
BFC Siófok players
FK Smederevo players
FK Moravac Mrštane players
ND Ilirija 1911 players
FK Sopot players
Serbian First League players
Nemzeti Bajnokság I players
Nemzeti Bajnokság II players
Serbian expatriate footballers
Expatriate footballers in Hungary
Expatriate footballers in Slovenia
Expatriate footballers in Albania
Serbian expatriate sportspeople in Hungary
Serbian expatriate sportspeople in Slovenia
Serbian expatriate sportspeople in Albania